Oldham Athletic Association Football Club is a professional football club in Oldham, Greater Manchester, England, which competes in the National League, the fifth tier of the English football league system. 

The history of Oldham Athletic began with the founding of Pine Villa F.C. in 1895, a team that played in the Manchester and Lancashire leagues. When neighbours Oldham County folded in 1899, Pine Villa moved into their stadium and changed their name to Oldham Athletic. They won the Lancashire Combination title in 1906–07 and were elected into the Football League. They won promotion out of the Second Division in 1909–10 and went on to finish second in the First Division in 1914–15, before being relegated in 1923. Another relegation in 1935 left them in the Third Division North, which they won at the end of the 1952–53 campaign, only to be relegated back into the following year. Placed in the Fourth Division, they secured promotion in 1962–63, and again in 1970–71 after another relegation in 1969.

Jimmy Frizzell managed the club from 1970 to 1982 and under his leadership, Oldham won the Third Division title in 1973–74. He was succeeded by Joe Royle, who also had a 12-year spell in charge, during which time Oldham reached the League Cup final in 1990, before winning the Second Division title in 1990–91, which took them back into the top-flight for the first time in 68 years. Oldham were founder members of the Premier League in 1992, but were relegated two years later and fell to the third tier by 1997. The club ended a 21-season-long stay in the third tier – which encompassed numerous financial crises – with relegation out of League One in 2018. At the end of the 2021–22 season, relegation from League Two was confirmed and the club fell into the National League, becoming the first former Premier League team to play non-League football.

They play home matches at Boundary Park. Known as the "Latics", Oldham traditionally play in blue shirts. The club has a rivalry known as the Roses derby with Huddersfield Town, as well as long-standing local rivalries with Bolton Wanderers, Rochdale and Stockport County.

History

Early history

In July 1895, licensee John Garland with his son formed a football club named Pine Villa Football Club with a group of friends inside the Featherstall & Junction Inn. The club was initially named after the Pine Mill whose shadow the club played in. The term Villa is thought to have originated due to Aston Villa's dominance at the time of formation. The club changed its appearance and name in 1899 to Oldham Athletic Football Club. The club immediately gained professional status and played in both the Lancashire Combination and Lancashire League. Unlike many clubs, Oldham Athletic gained quick success and gained acceptance into the Football League in 1907–08. After three years in the Second Division, Latics gained promotion to the First Division.

Within a couple of seasons, Oldham had announced themselves serious contenders, finishing 4th in the league in 1912–13, and reaching the F.A. Cup semi-finals the same season, losing out 1–0 versus Aston Villa. In 1914–15, Latics reached the quarter-finals of the FA Cup but were knocked out once again after a 0–3 replay against Sheffield United. In the league that season they almost won it all; Latics lost the league by one point, as close as they have ever come to winning the league. Latics early success was only halted by the First World War.

Interwar struggles

Following the return of competitive football after the First World War, Oldham Athletic struggled to find their early success before they returned to the Second Division in 1923 – it would be another 68 years before they played top division football again.

Many of the players from their former squads had either retired from football or had been killed in the war. Their highest success came in the 1929–30 season as they finished in 3rd, missing out on promotion by finishing two points behind Chelsea From then on they slowly but surely fell down the league table, until a final placing of 21st at the end of the 1934–35 season saw them relegated to the Third Division North. They found life in this new division much more to their liking, coming 7th in their first season and following this with three seasons in the top five. Promotion back to the Second Division looked like it might just be a possibility, but the outbreak of the Second World War in 1939 brought an end to League Football. Players' contracts were terminated, and relying largely on guest players, the club was to play in the war-time Northern League until August 1946.

Post-war plight

Following the return of competitive football there was to be no immediate success for Oldham Athletic. They finished 19th in the first league season after the war and manager Frank Womack resigned. In spite of reaching a more respectable 6th place under his successor Billy Wooton in 1949, it wasn't until the appointment of George Hardwick as player-manager in November 1950 that the club found any real form.

Hardwick's appointment came at a cost, with a £15,000 transfer fee paid to Middlesbrough. This was a huge amount at the time, especially for a third division club, but it was to stir up the town and its fans, who now looked forward to seeing a man who had been captain of England only two years previously in charge of its club's fortunes. In Hardwick's first full season in charge they finished 4th after topping the table for a considerable time. Home gates stayed high, with an amazing 33,450 watching a 1–0 win over local rivals Stockport County in March 1952, after a January game in the snow had established a new club scoring record when Chester were beaten 11–2. Eric Gemmell scored seven of these to establish an individual club record for one game which still stands to date. The season after, Oldham Athletic proudly finished champions of the division and won promotion to the Second Division. With an ageing squad and little money to recruit, however, the season that followed was a massive disappointment. Only eight games were won, Oldham finished in last place and quickly returned to the Third Division North, where a first equally disappointing season saw them finish no higher than 10th.

Hardwick resigned in 1955 and between then and 1960, they continued to struggle, finishing below the top 20 on three occasions. With a 15th-place finish in 1958–59, Oldham became a founding member of a newly formed Fourth Division. In the following season they finished in the 23rd position – their lowest position in the entire League, and had to apply for reelection, which they passed as the League chose to drop Gateshead, who had finished above them, in favour of newcomers Peterborough United.

Ken Bates entered the picture at Oldham Athletic in the early 1960s (where he was chairman for 5 years), and along with the appointment of manager Jack Rowley, the club's fortunes turned for the better. During the 1962–63 season, Oldham Athletic again gained promotion to the Third Division as Rowley left as manager. Over the next six seasons, Oldham struggled with consistency in the league and at the manager position, with Les McDowall, Gordon Hurst and Jimmy McIlroy all spending time at the managerial position.

In the 1968–69, Jack Rowley once more returned as manager. With their inconsistency, Rowley and Bates could not save the club from a last-place finish and inevitable relegation. Midway through the 1969–70 season, Rowley and Bates both left the club as Jimmy Frizzell became the Latics manager, a position he held for the next 13 seasons.

Frizzell and Royle eras

In the 1970–71 season, Oldham saw their best result since 1962–63 as they finished in third place, earning promotion back to the Third Division. After a mid-table finish in their first season, Latics missed out on promotion, finishing in fourth place, seven points behind local rivals and league champions Bolton Wanderers. In the 1973–74 season, the Latics finished in 1st place and returned to the Second Division for the first time in 21 years. Oldham's trip back to the Second Division was far more successful than their previous visit. During Frizzell's remaining time at the club, the Latics remained in the Second Division, but with little FA Cup and Football League Cup success.

In June 1982, the club appointed Joe Royle as their manager. Royle's side finished 7th in his first season in charge, but fell to 19th in his second. In the 1986–87 season, Oldham narrowly missed promotion to the First Division finishing three points behind Portsmouth and losing in the inaugural play-offs to Leeds United, when previous seasons would have seen them automatically promoted.

Royle's Latics reached Wembley Stadium in the 1990 Football League Cup final versus Nottingham Forest, where they lost 1–0. The next season, Oldham did not have the same cup success, but instead found success by winning the Second Division and returning to the First Division for the first time in 68 years. In their first season back in the top flight, the club finished 17th and became one of the founding members of the newly formed Premier League. After two further seasons at the top level, Oldham faced relegation yet again and during the following season, the Joe Royle era came to an end, as he left the club for Everton.

During this era, Oldham Athletic reached the FA Cup semi-finals twice, both times losing to Manchester United after a replay. In 1994 they were less than a minute away from winning 1–0 in extra time when a Mark Hughes equaliser for Manchester United saw the game at Wembley Stadium end in a 1–1 draw, and Oldham were beaten 4–1 in the replay at Maine Road. Many fans of Oldham in the years since have described the last minute equaliser by Hughes the start of a decline from which Oldham have never recovered. Oldham failed to win any of their seven remaining league games following the semi-final and were relegated on the final day of the season after a 1–1 draw at Norwich City.

1994–2018: second and third tier struggles

Graeme Sharp took over as Oldham's player-manager on the departure of Joe Royle in November 1994, but he was unable to mount a promotion challenge and the pressure continued to build up a year later when Oldham narrowly avoided relegation. Relegation to Division Two happened at the end of the 1996–97 season, just after Sharp had resigned to be succeeded by Neil Warnock.

As one of the biggest clubs in Division Two for 1997–98, and being managed by Warnock who had achieved no less than five promotions with other clubs in the last 11 years, Oldham Athletic were tipped for an immediate return to Division One, but they finished a disappointing 13th in the league and Warnock resigned. Oldham would ultimately stay in the third tier for 21 years. Veteran striker Andy Ritchie took over as player-manager, but he too failed to mount a promotion challenge and was sacked in October 2001 to be succeeded by Mick Wadsworth.

In 2001, Oxford-based businessman Chris Moore purchased Oldham Athletic, vowing to take the club back to Premier League football within five years. Wadsworth quit as manager in the summer of 2002 to make way for Iain Dowie, who transformed Oldham's fortunes on the pitch as they made their first serious challenge for promotion in Division Two. Oldham finished fifth and their promotion dreams were ended in the playoffs, and their fans were furious when Moore decided to end his interest with the club, leaving behind large debts and a weak squad, and after selling the better players at a fraction of their market value at the time. For a while, it looked as though the club would go out of business, but a takeover deal was soon completed.

In 2004–05, Simon Blitz and two other partners, Simon Corney and Danny Gazal, purchased Oldham Athletic, trying to rescue the club from possible liquidation. While trying to repay debts, Oldham struggled for several seasons, barely avoiding relegation once more in 2004–05. In 2006–07, Oldham's fortune turned for the better once more as the club narrowly missed out on promotion, losing to Blackpool 5–2 on aggregate in the play-off semi-final. After two years with the club, manager John Sheridan was sacked on 15 March 2009, immediately being replaced by former manager Royle. After being offered the job on a permanent basis, Royle rejected the proposal and announced that he would be leaving the club after the final game of the season. Darlington boss Dave Penney was announced as Royle's successor on 30 April. Penney was dismissed as Oldham manager on 6 May 2010, with his assistant, Martin Gray, taking over as caretaker manager for the final game of season 2009–10. During June 2010, Paul Dickov was named as Oldham Athletic player-manager signing a one-year contract. On 3 February 2013, he left his role as manager despite having knocked Liverpool out of the FA Cup the previous week.

On 18 March 2013, the club hired Lee Johnson to become the next manager; at the time of his appointment, he was the youngest manager in the Football League at 31. The club narrowly avoided relegation for the 2012–13 season, finishing 19th and just three points above the drop zone. The club fared better in Johnson's second season, finishing mid-table at 15th.

In January 2015, it was reported that Oldham was attempting to sign Ched Evans, an accused rapist. The move faced a significant public backlash, including from politicians, while a petition against the signing gained 60,000 signatures and Verlin Rainwater Solutions withdrew club sponsorship. Oldham ultimately decided not to sign Evans due to "unbearable pressure" while condemning the "vile and abusive threats, some including death threats, which have been made to our fans, sponsors and staff".

In January 2018, Moroccan football agent Abdallah Lemsagam agreed a deal with the club's majority shareholder Corney, ending his 14-year association with Oldham. Gazal and Blitz had left in 2010, with Corney staying as the majority shareholder. Lemsagam owned 97% of the club, while the Supporters' Trust maintained a 3% stake. The takeover did not include Boundary Park's North Stand, which the club did not own but could use on match days. In the two years prior to the Lemsagam deal, Oldham had faced a number of winding-up orders for non-payment of its tax bills, and saw its ground raided by HMRC in November 2017.

2018–22: fourth tier and relegation from EFL

Oldham were relegated to League Two on 5 May 2018. They had not been in the fourth tier since 1971. The club faced further HMRC winding-up petitions in late 2019 and early 2020. Former owner Blitz sought to put the club into administration on 6 March 2020 because of debts owed to his company, Brass Bank, which owned Boundary Park, but the case was adjourned to 21 April after a "significant" proportion of the debt was paid, as was Oldham's tax debt to HMRC. One-time Watford owner Laurence Bassini was reported to be interested in buying the club, but this was labelled as "false" during the 6 March hearing.

Former Australia international Harry Kewell took over as Oldham manager in August, at the start of the 2020–21 season and recorded 11 wins, six draws and 15 defeats before he was sacked by the club in March 2021. He left the club 10 points above the relegation places; some fans regarded the club's decision as premature given that Oldham had recently beaten promotion challengers Newport County, Forest Green Rovers and Salford City. Keith Curle stepped in as temporary head coach, and made the move permanent in May 2021, but his efforts to build a stronger squad were hampered by an EFL transfer embargo, COVID-19 illness, and fans protests against the club's owner.

On 7 September, with the club in 23rd position in the fourth tier, Lemsagam insisted he did not wish to sell his stake. Curle left Oldham in November. In December 2021 Lemsagam announced he was willing to sell the club amid accusations of late payment of salaries, threats of player strikes, and concerns about administration. Sheridan was re-appointed as manager in January 2022, but could not halt the slide towards the National League. With two games still to play, Oldham were relegated from the English Football League following a 2–1 home defeat by Salford City on 23 April, a match interrupted by an on-pitch protest by fans against the club's owner. The club became the first former Premier League team to drop into non-league since its creation in 1992.

2022–present: the National League

Following the relegation, the club's supporters' trust started to campaign for a community takeover of the club. On 30 June 2022, after Lemsagam and the Boundary Park owner agreed to a sale, it was reported Oldham Athletic could be sold within the next month to an unnamed local business. On 28 July 2022, it was confirmed that the club had been sold to businessman Frank Rothwell, owner of Oldham-based Manchester Cabins, and that Oldham were at an advanced stage in negotiations to buy Boundary Park from former owner Simon Blitz - a deal concluded in late August 2022.

Oldham started their first National League campaign with just two wins from their first eight games. Sheridan stepped down as manager on 17 September 2022 following a 3–2 defeat of Eastleigh and was replaced by David Unsworth.

Kit and badge
Latics originally started out playing in red and white hooped shirts with blue shorts, bearing strong similarities to the Oldham Rugby League Club colours. The red stripes were eventually replaced with blue, before this was in turn replaced by a white shirt with the blue stripe down the middle; this shirt was rumoured to have been influenced by the Ajax shirt of the times. In the mid-1960s, under the ownership of Ken Bates, the strip was changed to tangerine shirts with blue shorts. In the mid-1970s the club adopted an all blue shirt, and these colours have been worn ever since, with the exception of the red and blue hooped shirt that was used the late 1990s. This shirt proved unpopular among supporters and caused kit clashing problems, resulting in opposition teams occasionally having to wear Oldham's away kit. The club brought back the colours from the 1960s as an away kit for the 2007–08 season and this proved to be popular amongst the supporters. Home and away shirts currently bear the slogan "keep the faith" as a result of the financial turmoil the club faced in 2004. On 27 April, it was announced on a new website set up by the club (wearelatics.co.uk) that there was to be a new crest for the club. This new badge was shown on the new away kit for the 2011–12 season, and was introduced to the home kit for the following season. The badge contains the traditional blue and white colours, however, there is no longer any red visible; there is still an image of an owl, yet it remains on top of a football.

Kit suppliers and shirt sponsors
Table of kit suppliers and shirt sponsors appear below:

Stadium

After playing at what was originally called Athletic Ground, Boundary Park was opened for Oldham's first football club—Oldham County F.C. In 1899, after County had folded, Pine Villa moved into the ground and renamed the club and stadium. The stadium is located on the Oldham side of the conjunction of Oldham, Chadderton and Royton, and has a current capacity of 13,512. Before the demolition of the north stand in 2008, the stadium had a capacity of 13,624. The new north stand has recently opened with many new facilities available. This was done in a bid to gain extra revenue in a troubled cash stricken period for the club since Moore's departure.

The record attendance is 47,671 during an FA Cup tie between Oldham and Sheffield Wednesday in 1930 – the ground capacity at the time was nearly 50,000.

In February 2006, the club unveiled plans for the reconstruction of the stadium. After initially being rejected by Oldham Council, the decision was overturned with permission for the entire ground to be redeveloped. The ground was expected to seat at least 16,000 and cost approximately £80 million. On 5 September 2008, Simon Blitz announced on World Soccer Daily podcast that due to the economic problems in England, the development of the stadium was placed on hold temporarily.

On 22 July 2009, the club and Oldham Council unveiled plans for an entirely new, £20 million stadium to be located in Failsworth. The club made an agreement with BAE Systems to purchase a  piece of land, on which the club plans to build an initial 12,000-capacity arena along with other leisure and corporate facilities. Oldham Council initially backed the plans for the new stadium after council chiefs voted in favour of pushing forward with a land deal, but later offered the club £5.7 million to help with the redevelopment of Boundary Park, which would involve building a new North Stand on the site of the former Broadway Stand.

Initial preparatory work began on the site for the new North Stand at Boundary Park in mid-May 2013. The stand has a capacity of 2,671 for spectators and contains various other non-matchday facilities such as a health and fitness suite and supporters bar. The new North Stand partially opened against Sheffield United on 17 October 2015, with maximum capacity operation and corporate facilities in use on 26 December 2015 vs. Doncaster Rovers.

Support
Notable Oldham Athletic fans include comedy duo Cannon and Ball, professor and former musician Brian Cox, ex-Manchester United footballer Paul Scholes, television presenter Phillip Schofield, ex-Leeds Rhinos and England rugby captain Kevin Sinfield, The Courteeners rhythm guitarist Danny Moores, glamour model Michelle Marsh, Hollyoaks actor Alex Carter and comedian Eric Sykes.

Rivalries

Traditional local rivals include Bolton Wanderers, Stockport County, Rochdale, Bury and Blackburn Rovers, although none of these clubs are now a regular opponent.  Since the 1990s it could be considered that the Roses derby with Yorkshire neighbours Huddersfield Town has been the club's fiercest and most regular rivalry.

Dislike for Manchester United and Manchester City is also common and often eclipses more traditional rivalries amongst Oldham supporters. This is largely fuelled by Oldham's proximity to Manchester, with a sizeable number of people in the borough choosing to support one of the Manchester clubs rather than their local club. The dislike for Manchester United is also partly fuelled by the FA Cup Semi-Final meetings in 1990 and 1994, both of which Oldham lost after replays.

A survey conducted in August 2019 by GiveMeSport.com revealed that Latics fans consider Rochdale to be the club's main rival with 82% of votes, followed by Bolton Wanderers (74%), Huddersfield Town (67%), Blackburn Rovers (58%) and Manchester United (52%).

Conversely, Oldham Athletic have a long-standing supporters friendship with Eintracht Frankfurt. A small section of Frankfurt's support often makes the journey to Oldham Athletic games at Boundary Park.

Players

First-team squad

Out on loan

Youth team

Women's team
Oldham Athletic have a women's team who play in the Greater Manchester Women's Football League.

Club management

Club officials
Chairman: Frank Rothwell
General Manager: Steven Brown
Club Secretary: Jack Tomlinson
Head of Media: Alan Jones
Ticket Office Manager: Adam Street
HR/Accounts: Joseph Dyson
Stadium Manager: Rod Cross

Coaching positions
As of 6 October 2022
Manager/Head Coach: David Unsworth
Assistant Manager: John Ebbrell
Goalkeeper Coach: Steve Collis
First Team Coach: Francis Jeffers
Physiotherapist: Mick Rathbone
Head of Medical Services: Claire Swindell 
Sport Therapist: Adam Green 
Youth Team Physio: Becky O'Laughlin
Head of Performance Analysis: Dan Coates
Kit Man: Dean Pickering Sr.

Academy staff
Interim Academy Manager: Louis Dean
Head of Coaching: Craig Large
U18's Manager: Louis Dean
Strength & Conditioning Coach: Trystan Jones
Youth Development Phase Lead Coach: Michael O'Neill
Foundation Phase Lead Coach: David Hankey
Head of Education: Phil Arbelo-Dolan
Head of Recruitment: Steve Thompson
Administrator: Graham Yates

Managerial history

In the history of the club, only three managers have won a league title: George Hardwick (Division Three North, 1953), Jimmy Frizzell (Division Three, 1974) and Joe Royle (Division Two, 1991). Frizzell also won promotion from Division Four in 1971 (3rd place), as did Jack Rowley from the runners-up spot in 1963.

However, arguably the most successful manager in the club's history is David Ashworth. Appointed in 1906, he guided them to the Lancashire Combination Championship and promotion to the Football League in his first season. In 1910, after just three seasons in Division 2, they finished in second place and won promotion to the top flight of English football. For the next four years Ashworth maintained the club's smooth progress. They finished season 1913–14 in fourth place, only for Ashworth to move to Stockport County, leaving his successor Herbert Bamlett to take the team to its best-ever league placing the season after, when they finished runners-up to Everton, missing out on the League Championship by just one point.

Meanwhile, at the end of World War 1, Ashworth emerged as manager of Liverpool, guiding them to the League Championship in 1921–22, after they had finished fourth in his previous two seasons. Although he then took what seemed to many to be a strange decision, moving back to Oldham in a brave but failed attempt to save them from relegation in 1923, he remains the only Oldham Athletic manager ever to have won the Football League Championship with any club.

Honours
Oldham Athletic's honours include:

League 
Second Division/Championship (Tier 2)
Champions (1): 1990–91
2nd place promotion: 1909–10
Third Division/League One (Tier 3)
Champions (2): 1952–53, 1973–74
Fourth Division/League Two (Tier 4)
2nd place promotion: 1962–63
3rd place promotion: 1970–71
Lancashire Combination
Champions (1): 1906–07

Cups 
League Cup
Runners–up: 1989–90
Lancashire Senior Cup
Winners (3): 1907–08, 1966–67, 2005–06
Anglo-Scottish Cup
Runners–up: 1978–79

Club records
As of 29 September 2022 

Highest League finish: 2nd in Football League First Division, 1914–15
Best FA Cup performance: Semi-finals, 1912–13, 1989–90, 1993–94
Record League victory: 11–0 vs. Southport, Division Four, Boundary Park, 26 December 1962
Record FA Cup victory: 10–1 vs. Lytham, First Round, Boundary Park, 28 November 1925
Record League Cup victory: 7–0 vs. Scarborough, Second Round, Boundary Park, 25 October 1989
Record League defeat: 4–13 vs. Tranmere Rovers, Division Three (North), Prenton Park, 26 December 1935
Record FA Cup defeat: 0–6 vs. Huddersfield Town, Third Round, Leeds Road, 13 January 1932 and 0–6 vs. Tottenham Hotspur, Third Round, White Hart Lane, 14 January 1933
Record League Cup defeat: 0–7 vs. Brentford, League Cup, Third Round, Brentford Community Stadium, 21 September 2021
Record home attendance: 47,671 vs. Sheffield Wednesday, FA Cup, Fourth Round, Boundary Park, 25 January 1930
Record home league attendance: 45,304 vs. Blackpool, Division Two, Boundary Park 21 April 1930
Longest unbeaten league run: 20 league games between 1 May 1990 and 17 November 1990 in Division Two
Most League appearances: 525 Ian Wood, 1966–1980
Most overall appearances: 582 Ian Wood, 1966–1980
Most League goals: 141 Roger Palmer, 1980–1994
Most overall goals: 156 Roger Palmer, 1980–1994
Most League goals in a season: 33 Tom Davis, Division 3 (North), 1936–37
Most capped player: 25 Gunnar Halle – Norway, 1991–1996
Record transfer fee paid: £750,000 Ian Olney, Aston Villa, June 1992
Record transfer fee received: £1,700,000 Earl Barrett, Aston Villa, February 1992
Oldest player: David Eyres aged 42, vs. Scunthorpe United, 6 May 2006
Youngest player: Zak Emmerson, aged 15 years 73 days, vs. Walsall, 22 October 2019

References

External links

Oldham Athletic official website
Oldham Athletic Mad
Oldham Athletic Books (Oldham Athletic: On This Day & Oldham Athletic: Miscellany)

Independent media sites

 
1895 establishments in England
Association football clubs established in 1895
Football clubs in England
Lancashire Combination
National League (English football) clubs
Former English Football League clubs
Premier League clubs